Bombycomorpha bifascia, the pepper-tree caterpillar, is a moth of the family Lasiocampidae, which is native to southern Africa.

Food plants
The larvae feed on the foliage of Searsia dentata, the pepper-tree Schinus molle, and other Anacardiaceae. They show a preference for the foliage of the introduced pepper-tree. The larvae are highly gregarious and feed in small groups, with a tendency to become cannibalistic when food is depleted.

Life cycle
The 40 mm long larva is black with two narrow yellow lines (bifascia) running down each flank. A coating of orange hairs gives it a yellowish appearance. Moulting four times they attain full size in 50–60 days, at which point they descend to ground level and search for a suitable pupating spot. The cocoons are about 20 mm long and chocolate-brown in colour, their surface texture and colour resembling that of dried mud. After some 14 days the moth emerges. If weather conditions are unfavourable the larvae hibernate until the following spring.

Etymology
Their generic name Bombycomorpha refers to their resemblance to the silkworm moths, genus Bombyx.

Life stages

References

External links
 

Lasiocampidae
Moths of Africa
Moths described in 1855